Contagious is the third full-length studio album of Philippine bossa nova singer Sitti, after 2006's Café Bossa and 2007's My Bossa Nova. It was released in mid-2009.

Track listing
"Your Love Is King" (Sade Adu, Stuart Matthewman) - 4:32
"How Insensitive (Insensatez)" (Antonio Carlos Jobim, Vinicius de Moraes, Norman Gimbel) - 5:04
"Is This Love" (George Noriega, Jorge Gonzalez, Andrew Fromm, Howard Dorough, Merecco Turner) - 4:05
"Adia" (Pierre Marchand, Sarah McLachlan) - 4:34
"Chega de Saudade" (Jobim, de Moraes) - 4:05
"A Certain Sadness" (Carlos Eduardo Lyra, John Court) - 3:26
"So Em Teus Braços" (Jobim) - 2:16
"Dindi" (Jobim, Aloysio de Oliveria) - 5:13
"La-La (Means I Love You)" (Thom Bell, William Hart) - 3:58
"Do You Really Want to Hurt Me" (Culture Club) - 4:23
"No More I Love You's" (Joseph Hughes, David Freeman) - 3:44
"Let Me In" (Mike Francis) - 3:41
"Promises / New Day for You" (Basia, Danny White, Peter Ross) - 4:46
"One on One" (Daryl Hall) - 3:03
"Till There Was You" (Meredith Willson) - 2:56
"Bossa Nova Baby" (Jerry Leiber, Mike Stoller) - 2:25

Personnel
Sitti Navarro - vocals
Chito Servañez - piano
Erskine Basilio - nylon guitar
Sonny Teodoro - percussion
Rex Nogares - electric / upright bass
Archie Lacorte - saxophone, flute
Gian Vergel - drums

2009 albums
Bossa nova albums
Sitti albums
Warner Music Philippines albums